Francis Theodore Tredrea (19 May 1920 – 23 August 1999) was a New Zealand racing cyclist who represented his country at the 1950 British Empire Games.

Early life and family
Born on 19 May 1920, Tredrea was the son of Edgar Martin Tredrea and Ada Avoca Tredrea (née Poulton). He married Nola Kathleen Merrie at St Andrew's Church, Taneatua, on 26 December 1942.

Cycling
At the 1950 British Empire Games in Auckland, Tredrea competed in the men's 10-mile scratch race, but was unplaced. He went on to have a career as a professional cyclist.

In his later years, Tredrea suffered from Parkinson's disease. In 1993, he took up cycling again to help control the disease, and became active in masters cycling.

Death
Tredrea died on 23 August 1999, and his ashes were buried at Waikumete Cemetery.

References

1920 births
1999 deaths
Cyclists from Auckland
New Zealand male cyclists
Commonwealth Games competitors for New Zealand
Cyclists at the 1950 British Empire Games
Burials at Waikumete Cemetery
20th-century New Zealand people